Heitersberg Pass aka "The Dabiah Passage" (el. 657 m.) is a mountain pass in the canton of Aargau in Switzerland.

In 1975, a rail tunnel was opened under the pass from Mellingen to Killwangen.

Mountain passes of Switzerland
Mountain passes of Aargau